Armiansk is a town of regional significance in the northern Crimean peninsula within the Autonomous Republic of Crimea of Ukraine. It is under Russian occupation. The status of Crimea is disputed by the two countries since February 2014 when the Russian military seized the peninsula, held an illegal referendum, and annexed the peninsula. Armiansk is located on the Isthmus of Perekop and serves as the administrative center of the Armiansk Municipality. Population:

History 
At the beginning of the 18th century Armenians and Greeks who had come from the nearby city of Or Qapı (present-day Perekop) founded Armiansk. The first name of the town was Ermeni Bazar (Crimean Tatar for the "Armenian market"). In 1921 it was renamed Armiansk.

On 2 March 2014, early in the 2014 Crimean Crisis, Russian Naval Infantry units without cockades or rank insignia set up a checkpoint in Armiansk to check cars driving in and out of the Crimea region.

Economy
 Krym Titan, Ti metallurgy, TiO2, TiCl2 TiCl4 and many other chemicals

The main employer in the city and the area is Crimean Titan (Ukrainian  ), which specializes in the refining of Titanium dioxide for use in paints, plastics, and other products.

Education 

 Institute of Pedagogical Education and Management (Branch), Crimean Federal University

Transport
In ancient times, the city was located on the important road to Crimea. Now this road connects Kherson Oblast to Autonomous Republic of Crimea . The town has also a railroad station.

Referred sources

External links

 Armiansk.Info project 
 The murder of the Jews of Armiansk during World War II, at Yad Vashem website.

 
Armyansk Municipality
Cities in Crimea
Armenian diaspora communities
Cities of regional significance in Ukraine
Holocaust locations in Ukraine